The Queen of Rock' a 'Billy is a studio album by American recording artist Wanda Jackson. It was released in 1997 via Elap Music and contained eleven tracks of material. The album was a collection of Rockabilly recordings, most of which were new to Jackson's catalog. The disc was the second Jackson recorded with rock group The Alligators. It was released exclusively for the European market.

Background, content and release
With a series of songs beginning in the 1950s, Wanda Jackson became among the first women to have commercial success in Country and Rockabilly music. Her most popular singles included "Let's Have a Party", "Right or Wrong" and "The Box It Came In". She left secular music in the 1970s and recorded a series of gospel albums before returning to rock in the 1980s. She was sought out by European fans and promoters and continued a steady fan base overseas. In 1994, she met Danish rock band The Alligators and released an album with them in 1995. The Queen of Rock' a 'Billy would be her second collaboration with The Alligators. On the album's release, the band was not given dual credit.

Jackson recorded the project alongside Alligators member Morten Kjeldsen serving as producer. The group served as her backing band on the album, similar to her previous release with the group. The album was recorded at the Pek Farm Studio located in Ormslev, Denmark. A total of 11 Rockabilly numbers were chosen for the album, which included a re-recording of Jackson's 1958 single "Fujiyama Mama". She also re-recorded "Rip It Up", which originally appeared on her 1964 studio album. Jackson also cut "Rockabilly Fever" again, which first appeared on her 1984 album of the same name. Remaining songs were new to Jackson's catalog, including a cover of Tanya Tucker's "Walking Shoes" and Jann Browne's "You Ain't Down Home". The album was released in 1997 on the Elap Music label. It was issued as a compact disc only for the European market.

Track listing

Personnel
All credits are adapted from the liner notes of The Queen of Rock' a 'Billy.

Musical personnelThe Alligators (see below)
 Olle Ballund – Background vocals, drums
 Jens Dan – Acoustic guitar, background vocals, bass
 Morten Kjeldsen – Background vocals, guitar
 Wanda Jackson – Lead vocals
 Niels Mathiasen – Tenor saxophone
 Stan Urban – Accordion, piano

Technical personnel
 Morten Kjeldsen – Mixing, producer
 Jørn Sørensen – Engineering, mixing

Release history

References

1997 albums
Wanda Jackson albums